The 1990 USAC FF2000 Championship was the first season of the series. The series was sanctioned by the United States Auto Club and ran races in California and Arizona. Vince Puleo, Jr. won the inaugural championship in a Fast LG-1 entered by Fast Forward Racing.

Race calendar and results

Final standings

References

U.S. F2000 National Championship seasons
USAC FF2000